Alan Hays Grant (born October 1, 1966) is a former American football cornerback in the National Football League for the Indianapolis Colts, San Francisco 49ers, Cincinnati Bengals, and the Washington Redskins.  He played college football at Stanford University and was drafted in the fourth round of the 1990 NFL Draft.  

1966 births
Living people
Players of American football from Pasadena, California
Players of Canadian football from Pasadena, California
American football cornerbacks
Stanford Cardinal football players
Indianapolis Colts players
San Francisco 49ers players
Cincinnati Bengals players
Washington Redskins players
American players of Canadian football
Saskatchewan Roughriders players